Pyrgus is a genus in the skippers butterfly family, Hesperiidae, known as the grizzled skippers. The name "checkered" or "chequered skipper" may also be applied to some species, but also refers to species in the genera Burnsius and Carterocephalus. They occur in the Holarctic with an additional group of species extending to the Neotropic.

In 2019, most of the species of Pyrgus found in the North, Central, or South America were moved to the genera Burnsius, Chirgus, and Heliopetes. The remaining Pyrgus species found in the New World are Pyrgus centaureae, ruralis, scriptura, and xanthus.

Species
These species belong to the genus Pyrgus:

 Pyrgus accretus (Verity, 1925)
 Pyrgus alpinus Erschoff, 1874
 Pyrgus alveus (Hübner, 1803) (large grizzled skipper)
 Pyrgus andromedae (Wallengren, 1853) (Alpine grizzled skipper)
 Pyrgus armoricanus (Oberthur, 1910) (oberthür's grizzled skipper)
 Pyrgus cacaliae (Rambur, 1839) (dusky grizzled skipper)
 Pyrgus carlinae (Rambur, [1839]) (carline skipper)
 Pyrgus carthami (Hübner, [1813]) (safflower skipper)
 Pyrgus centaureae (Rambur, 1842) (northern grizzled skipper)
 Pyrgus centralitaliae (Verity, 1920)
 Pyrgus cinarae (Rambur, 1839) (sandy grizzled skipper)
 Pyrgus cirsii (Rambur, 1839) (cinquefoil skipper)
 Pyrgus foulquieri (Oberthür, 1910) (foulquier's grizzled skipper)
 Pyrgus jupei (Alberti, 1967) (caucasian skipper)
 Pyrgus maculatus Bremer & Grey, 1853
 Pyrgus malvae (Linnaeus, 1758) (grizzled skipper)
 Pyrgus malvoides (Elwes & Edwards, 1897) (southern grizzled skipper)
 Pyrgus melotis Duponchel, 1832 (aegean skipper)
 Pyrgus nepalensis Higgins, 1984
 Pyrgus onopordi (Rambur, 1839) (rosy grizzled skipper)
 Pyrgus pontica Reverdin, 1914
 Pyrgus ruralis (Boisduval, 1852) (two-banded checkered skipper)
 Pyrgus scriptura (Boisduval, 1852) (small checkered skipper)
 Pyrgus serratulae (Rambur, [1839]) (olive skipper)
 Pyrgus sidae (Esper, 1784) (yellow-banded skipper)
 Pyrgus speyeri (Staudinger, 1887)
 Pyrgus warrenensis (Verity, 1928) (warren's skipper)
 Pyrgus xanthus W. H. Edwards, 1878 (mountain checkered skipper)

References and external links 

 Pyrgus page from 
 Yellow-banded Skipper page
 Pyrgus ruralis page
 Edinburg WBC NE Mexico Trip
 Safflower Skipper
 Moths and butterflies of Europe and North Africa
 English butterfly names for North America
 List of Hesperiidae photographed by O. Kosterin
 Funet

 
Taxa named by Jacob Hübner
Hesperiidae genera
Pyrgini